The Chinese Football Association Super League, commonly known as Chinese Super League or CSL, currently known as the China Ping An Chinese Football Association Super League for sponsorship reasons, is the highest tier of professional football in China, operating under the auspices of the Chinese Football Association (CFA). The league was established in 2004 by the rebranding of the former top division, Chinese Jia-A League.

Initially contested by 12 teams in its inaugural year, the league has since expanded, with 18 teams competing in the 2023 season. A total of 37 teams have competed in the CSL since its inception, with 9 of them winning the title: Guangzhou (eight), Shandong Taishan (four), Shenzhen, Dalian Shide, Changchun Yatai, Beijing Guoan, Shanghai Port, Jiangsu, and Wuhan Three Towns (one title each). The current Super League champions are Wuhan Three Towns, who won the 2022 edition.

The Chinese Super League is one of the most popular professional sports leagues in China, with an average attendance of 24,107 for league matches in the 2018 season. This was the twelfth-highest of any domestic professional sports league in the world and the sixth-highest of any professional association football league in the world, behind Bundesliga, Premier League, La Liga, Serie A and Liga MX.

The League is now running under the authorization of the Chinese Football Association, The CSL Company, which is currently the commercial branch of the League, is a corporation in which the CFA and all of the member clubs act as shareholders. It is planned that the CFA will ultimately transfer their shares of The CSL Company to the clubs and professional union which consists of CSL clubs will be established as the League's management entity.

Overview

Competition 

Unlike many top European leagues like Bundesliga, Premier League, La Liga, and Serie A, the Chinese Super League starts in February or March and ends in November or December. In each season, each club plays each of the other clubs twice, once at home and another away. With 18 clubs currently in the Super League, teams play 10 games each, for a total of 90 games in the season.

The two lowest-placed teams by the end of the season are relegated to the China League One and the top two teams from the League One are promoted, taking their places.

The League position is determined by the highest number of points accumulated during the season. If two or more teams are level on points, tiebreakers are, in the following order
 Highest number of points accumulated in matches between the teams concerned;
 Highest goal difference in matches between the teams concerned;
 Highest number of goals scored in matches between the teams concerned;
 Highest points accumulated by the reserve teams in the reserve league
 Highest points accumulated by the U19 teams in the U19 league
 Highest goal difference;
 Highest number of goals scored;
 Fair-Play points (Clubs deduct 1 point for a yellow card, and 3 points for a red card);
 Draw by lot;

Chinese Super League clubs in international competition

When the Asian Football Confederation started the AFC Champions League in the 2002–03 season, China was given 2 slots in the competition. Qualification for the AFC Champions League changed in 2009 as AFC distributed 4 slots to China. The top three of the league, as well as the winner of the Chinese FA Cup, qualify for the AFC Champions League of the next year. If the FA Cup finalists finish the league in 3rd or higher, the 4th place team in the league will take the Champions League spot.

Between the 2002–03 and the 2017 season, Chinese clubs won the AFC Champions League two times, behind Korean K-League with five wins, and Japanese J-League with three wins.

Development

On 17 November 2017, the Vice-president of the CFA, Li Yuyi, disclosed the expansion plan of the top four level leagues of China. The Chinese Super League is planning to expand to 18 clubs, followed by China League One with 20 clubs, China League Two with 32 clubs and the Chinese Football Association Member Association Champions League with 48 clubs.

Also, the CFA stated that "we should build CSL the 6th best league in the world."

History

Origins

The Chinese National Football League was started in 1951, namely the National Football Conference, it was a round-robin tournament with 8 teams participating. In 1954, the competition was renamed as National Football League, the League was divided into two Divisions in 1956 and promotion/relegation between the two tiers started in 1957. In the 1980s, the Chinese Football Association allowed enterprise entities to sponsor and invest in football teams. The League entered Semi-pro period in 1987, sponsored by Goldlion Group, the league played its first-ever home and away season, teams participating includes the top 7 clubs of 1986 Division 1 together with Liaoning, who was 1985 season champions but did not compete in 1986 league season due to participate in Asian Club Championship, the tournament was named as National Football League Division 1 Group A, shortly as Chinese Jia-A League, the other 8 clubs of Division 1 and top 4 clubs from Division 2 participated in Chinese Jia-B League. The two groups merged in the 1988 season but divided again in 1989.

In 1994, as part of the sports system reform project, the Chinese Jia-A League became the country's first professional football league. The Jia-A league achieved success in its early years, but in the late ’90s heavy criticism existed towards the League's management practices like the lack of continuity in key policies, and some of its member clubs was criticised for a lack of sustainable development. At the same time, the league was affected by gambling, match-fixing and corruption. the chaotic state of Jia-A causes troubled investment environment with sponsors and club owners bowing out. The Chinese Football Association then decided to reform the League system, which ultimately led to the creation of the Chinese Super League. The initial conception is to introduce truly commercial methods and let the professional football market operate more freely, drawing on the experience of professional Leagues in Europe to redesign the league structure and strengthen professionalism.

On January 13, 2001, Yan Shiduo, vice-president of the Chinese Football Association, discussed setting up a new professional league system. In 2002, the CFA made a decision to establish the Chinese Super League, which started in 2004.

Foundation

Compared to the Jia-A, the CSL is a lot more demanding on teams. The CFA and CSL committee imposed a range of minimum criteria to ensure professional management and administration, financial probity, and a youth development program at every club. The CSL published first edition of CSL club criteria in 2002 and revised it several times, club license system was introduced since 2004. Besides the regular professional league, the CSL also has a reserve league, and Youth super league plays in U-19,U-17,U-15,U-14 and U-13 levels.

The CSL and China League One's goals are to promote high-quality and high-level competition, introduce advanced managerial concepts to the market, enforce the delivery of minimum standards of professionalism, encourage an influx of higher-quality foreign coaches and players, and gradually establish the European system for player registrations and transfers.

Summary

The first CSL season began in 2004, with 12 teams in the league. The inaugural season was plagued with controversy, which continued from the former league, Jia-A, and where, since 1999, scandals such as match-fixing and gambling had been uncovered. This resulted in the loss of interest in the domestic game, low attendances and great financial losses.

The original plan was to have one relegated team and two promoted teams for the 2004 season and 2005 season, thus increasing the number of teams in 2006 to 14. But the CFA's decisions caused the relegations to be cancelled for these 2 years.

For the 2005 season, the league expanded to 14 teams after Wuhan Huanghelou and Zhuhai Zobon won promotion from China League One. The Zhuhai team, formerly named Zhuhai Anping, had been bought by the Shanghai Zobon real estate company and relocated to Shanghai for the 2005 season, and subsequently renamed to Shanghai Zobon.

In 2006, the league was planned to expand to 16 teams with the newly promoted Xiamen Blue Lions and Changchun Yatai. However, Sichuan First City withdrew before the start of the season, leaving only 15 teams when the season started on March 11. Shanghai Zobon, after another change of ownership, was renamed Shanghai United.

In 2007, the league was again planned to be expanded to 16 teams, but once again it found itself one team short. Shanghai United's owner, Zhu Jun, bought a major share in local rival Shanghai Shenhua and merged the two teams. As a result, Shanghai Shenhua retained its name as it already had a strong fanbase in the city, while Shanghai United pulled out of the league.

In 2008, the season started with 16 clubs participating for the first time, however, Wuhan protested against punishments made by the CFA after a match against Beijing Guoan, and announced its immediate withdrawal from the league, which left the season to finish with 15 clubs.

Since 2009, the league has run with 16 stable clubs participating each year. Two are relegated to China League One, and two are promoted from China League One each season.

In 2010, the CSL was beset by a scandal going right to the top of the CFA. The Chinese government took nationwide action against football gambling, match-fixing and corruption, and former CFA vice presidents Xie Yalong, Nan Yong and Yang Yimin were arrested. On February 22, 2010, CFA relegated Guangzhou Yiyao for match-fixing in 2006 China League One Season, as well as Chengdu Blades for match-fixing in 2007 China League One season.

In 2011, the anti-corruption movement had visibly improved the image of the CSL, with increases to attendance. Clubs such as Guangzhou Evergrande and Shanghai Shenhua began investing heavily in foreign stars. After former Fluminense midfielder Darío Conca transferred in 2011, some notable signings during the 2012 seasons included former Chelsea forward Didier Drogba and Nicolas Anelka, former Barcelona midfielder Seydou Keita and Fábio Rochemback, former Sevilla forward Frédéric Kanouté, former Blackburn Rovers forward Yakubu and former Borussia Dortmund forward Lucas Barrios. Former Japanese national team coach Takeshi Okada took up the reins as the new coach of Hangzhou Greentown, former Argentina national team coach Sergio Batista replaced Jean Tigana as Shanghai Shenhua's head coach, and former Italy national team and Juventus manager Marcello Lippi replaced Lee Jang-Soo as Guangzhou Evergrande's head coach.

In 2012, Guangzhou Evergrande became the first Chinese team to defend their CSL title, and to win consecutive titles. However, eight-time champions of Professional League, Dalian Shide, had seriously financial problems during the entire season, especially after the arrest of club owner Xu Ming. They had planned to merge with Dalian Aerbin, the other CSL club of the city, but the Chinese Football Association blocked the merger at the end, as Dalian Shide failed to cancel their registration as a CSL club before the merger. So Aerbin effectively purchased and swallowed up Shide, including the club's famed academy and training facilities. Dalian Shide was officially dissolved on 31 January 2013. The country's most successful club had ceased to exist.

In 2013, David Beckham became first global ambassador for CSL. In February 2013, Shanghai Shenhua was stripped of its 2003 Chinese Ji-A league title as part of a broad match-fixing crackdown. In total, 12 clubs were handed punishments, while 33 people, including former CFA vice-president Xie Yalong and Nan Yong, received life bans. Also in 2013, Guangzhou Evergrande Taobao won the Asian Champions League title, the first time a Chinese Super League team has won that award.

In 2014, Guangzhou Evergrande became the first Chinese club to win four consecutive professional league titles.

In 2015, ex-Tottenham midfielder Paulinho moved to Guangzhou Evergrande at the age of 27, Guangzhou Evergrande become AFC champions League champions for second time.

In 2016, the Chinese super league became a rising power in the global transfer market. Brazil international Ramires, Colombia international Jackson Martinez and Fredy Guarin were among the notable signings, while Pavel Nedvěd was appointed as second global ambassador for CSL.

2017 saw the Chinese Super League (CSL) catapulted to global attention. Players such as Oscar, Carlos Tevez, Ricardo Carvalho, Alexandre Pato and Mikel John Obi all moved east during the year. Guangzhou Evergrande won their 7th consecutive league title.

2018, in the 28th round of the 2018 Chinese Super League, the two title favourites Shanghai SIPG and Guangzhou Evergrande Taobao clashed head-to-head, with Shanghai SIPG coming away with 5 - 4 hard win over Guangzhou Evergrande Taobao to open up the points gap with Guangzhou Evergrande Taobao. At last, Shanghai SIPG won the 2018 Chinese Super League Champion, thus breaking Guangzhou Evergrande Taobao's 7-year monopoly of the Chinese Super League.

At the 2019 CSL Mobilization Meeting, the CFA Referees Committee officially announced that a professional referee system will be introduced in the CSL in 2019, with two foreign referees including Mark Clattenburg, Milorad Mažić, and three local referees to be officially hired as the first professional referees in the history of Chinese football. The two foreign professional referees will be mainly responsible for enforcing the Chinese Super League, but will also provide coaching and training for local referees.

Affected by COVID-19,the 2020 Chinese Super League has been postponed to July 25. The 16 teams will be divided into two groups to play in Suzhou and Dalian. This year's league was temporarily changed to a "Group stage + Knockout" format and adopted a tournament system.

Planning cooperation structure

The preparatory committee of the Chinese Professional Football League was established on May 27, 2016, with members from 5 CSL clubs, 3 CL1 clubs and 2 CL2 clubs, includes two CFA representatives. The blueprint is to have all of the three professional level leagues of China, the Chinese Super League, China Football League one and China Football League two separated from the League structure of the CFA. The PFL will be a private company wholly owned by its Member Clubs who make up the League at any one time. Each club is a shareholder, with one vote each on issues such as rule changes and contracts. The newly formed PFL would have commercial independence from The CFA, giving the PFL licence to negotiate its own broadcast and sponsorship agreements.

The CFA will no longer hold any shares of the League, but as the national governing body for football in China, the CFA is responsible for sanctioning competition Rule Books, and regulating on-field matters. It also organises The CFA Cup competition, in which PFL Member Clubs compete and the lower division leagues ranked after CL2, under a specific agreement between CFA and PFL. The CFA also has the ability to exercise a vote on certain specific issues, but has no role in the day-to-day running of the CSL, CL1 and CL2.

On January 3, 2017, the CFA announced that Chinese Professional Football League, formed as a limited company, will be established in March 2017, the CSL and CL1 clubs will be found members of the PFL starts from 2017, with CL2 planning to join the system by 2019. The PFL preparatory committee will discuss and establish the regulations and the structures of the PFL, holding the elections of the PFL president in January and February 2017. However, after a series of meetings includes CFA officers and club owners, the plan had been put on hold.

Clubs

Champions

Performances in Chinese Super League

Current clubs

Former clubs

Overall team records

In this ranking, three points are awarded for a win, one for a draw, and none for a loss. As per statistical convention in football, matches decided in extra time are counted as wins and losses, while matches decided by penalty shoot-outs are counted as draws. Teams are ranked by total points, then by goal difference, then by goals scored.

Rivalries 
There are several key rivalries and local derbies that have formed in the Chinese Super League, including:

"Shanghai Derbies"
 2004: Shanghai Shenhua v Inter Shanghai
 2005: Shanghai Shenhua v Inter Shanghai v Shanghai United
 2006: Shanghai Shenhua v Shanghai United
 2012: Shanghai Shenhua v Shanghai Shenxin
 2013–2015: Shanghai Shenhua v Shanghai Shenxin v Shanghai Port
 2016–present: Shanghai Shenhua v Shanghai Port

"Guangzhou Derbies"
 2012–2022: Guangzhou v Guangzhou City

"Dalian Derbies"
 2012: Dalian Shide v Dalian Aerbin

"Tianjin Derbies"
 2017–2019: Tianjin Teda v Tianjin Tianhai

"Beijing Derbies"
 2018–2019: Beijing Guoan v Beijing Renhe

"Wuhan Derbies"
 2022: Wuhan Yangtze River v Wuhan Three Towns

Players

Player salaries and transfers
Professional footballers in China receive relatively high salaries when compared to other Chinese sports leagues and football leagues in other countries. The average salary for CSL players is $1,016,579 in 2017, it is ranked at eleventh place among all of the professional sports leagues and the sixth-highest of any professional association football league in the world.

CSL has two transfer windows—the primary pre-season transfer window lasts two months from January to February, and the secondary mid season transfer window runs one month from mid June to mid July. As of the 2018 season, the CSL introduced new rules mandating that each club must register a maximum 31-man squad, with 27 Chinese Players, including a player from Hong Kong, Macau and Chinese Taipei, and 4 foreign players. In the transfer window clubs could sign 5 Chinese players at any age, plus 3 under 21 Chinese players; clubs could register 4 foreign players in the winter transfer, and replace two of them in the summer transfer.

The record transfer fee for a CSL player has risen rapidly since the investment boost started in 2015. The six most expensive transfers with players coming to CSL have exceeded €30 million, with Chelsea selling Oscar to Shanghai SIPG in December 2016 for a fee of €60 million, Zenit Saint Petersburg selling Hulk to Shanghai SIPG for €55.8 million in July 2016, Shakhtar Donetsk selling Alex Teixeira to Jiangsu Suning for €50 million in February 2016, Atlético Madrid selling Jackson Martínez to Guangzhou Evergrande for €42 million in February 2016, Villarreal selling Cédric Bakambu to Beijing Guoan for €40 million in February 2018, Atlético Madrid selling Yannick Carrasco to Dalian Yifang for €30 million in February 2018. Guangzhou Evergrande's sale of Paulinho to Barcelona for €40 million in 2017 broke the record for a CSL player transfer to other leagues. Transfer fees for domestic players also increased dramatically. Beijing Guoan sold Chinese International Zhang Chengdong to Hebei China Fortune for ¥150 million in January 2017, breaking the domestic transfer record for Chinese players.

The Chinese Football Association introduced a new transfer tax to restrict transfer spending. On June 20, 2017, CFA announced that any club that pays more than ¥45 million for a foreign player transfer or ¥20 million for a Chinese player transfer must pay the same amount to a CFA youth development fund.

In December 2020, the CFA imposed a salary cap on the Super League. Starting with the 2021 season, total player wages are capped at ¥600 million, with a separate limit of €10 million for foreign players. Individual player salaries are also capped, at ¥5 million before tax for Chinese players and €3 million for foreign players.

Foreign Player policy

In early years numerous players from Eastern Europe, Africa and Latin America regions were signed as the foreign players in the Chinese league. Steadily, a lot of players transferred to China from major European and South American Leagues. The league has rules, at present, restricting the number of foreign players strictly to four per team.  A team could use a maximum of three foreign players on the field each game. This is to promote native player improvement and to conform to rules regarding international club competitions in the AFC. Between 2009 and 2017, there was an additional slot for a player from AFC countries. During the middle of the 2012 season, it was decided that teams that were competing in the AFC Champions League were allowed to have two extra foreign players, which can bring the number of foreigners on a team's seven; however, the policy was removed in the 2013 season.

Hong Kong, Macau and Taiwanese players 
Policy for Hong Kong, Macau and Taiwanese players has changed continually. Players from Hong Kong Football Association were considered foreigners at the beginning of 2009, but the league held back the change until the summer transfer window. After the 2010 season, players from Macau Football Association and Chinese Taipei Football Association (except goalkeepers) were not considered foreigners in CSL matches, but will be regarded as foreigners in AFC competitions. In the 2015 season, players who had not played for the Hong Kong national football team, Macau national football team or the Chinese Taipei national football team were no longer deemed native players. In the 2016 and 2017 season, players from the three associations whose contract was signed after 1 January 2016 were no longer deemed native players. From the 2018 season, a club could register one non-naturalized player from the three associations as a native player. According to the Chinese FA, a non-naturalized player refers to someone who was first registered as a professional footballer in the three football associations. Furthermore, Hong Kong or Macau players must be of Chinese descent of Hong Kong or Macau permanent resident, and Taiwanese players must be citizens of Taiwan.

Most goals and appearances

Head coaches

In early years Chinese and Serbian coaches achieved success in the Chinese Super League. Just like the Jia-A period, the majority of foreign coaches were from countries like Serbia, Croatia and South Korea. Nowadays most CSL clubs appoint coaches from Western Europe and South America. Guangzhou Evergrande were the first side to spend big to bring in European and South American coaches. World Cup winning managers Marcello Lippi and Luiz Felipe Scolari had successful experiences at Guangzhou Evergrande. Famous coaches who have coached in China include Fabio Capello, Felix Magath, Manuel Pellegrini, Dan Petrescu, André Villas-Boas, Cuca, Sven-Göran Eriksson, Sergio Batista, Radomir Antić.

Attendance

The Chinese Super League has the highest average attendance of any football league in Asia. However, stadiums have capacity restrictions.

Season averages

Attendance by clubs 
This table lists average attendances of clubs yearly, but only for seasons when that club played in the top division. Clubs are listed with their current names.

Individual game highest attendance records

Awards 

The official Chinese Super league annual awards are given to clubs, players, managers and referees based on their performance during the season.

Trophy

The Fire-god trophy is the official trophy award to CSL champions. The trophy was created by the Sculpture Department of the Central Academy of Fine Arts and donated by the official partner of the Chinese Super League, Hengyuanxiang Group, in 2004. It consists of a pure gold trophy and a nephrite plinth base. The lower part of the trophy is the model of a Great Wall beacon tower; on the upper part, on top of the rising beacon, is a football wrapped by the earth, while the base has the engraved years and names of each Chinese Super League winner since 2004. The trophy weighs .

The trophy is not awarded to the winning club permanently. After the award ceremony they are awarded a replica, and they are allowed to retain the genuine trophy for one year.

Player of the Year 

It is also named the "Most Valuable Player".

Golden Boot Award 
This award is awarded to the top goalscorer of the league that year.

There is also an award that is awarded to the top Chinese goalscorer of that season, which was first introduced in 2011.

Manager of the Year

Youth Player of the Year 

There is also an award that is awarded to the U-23 player of the year, which was first introduced in 2017.

Goalkeeper of the Year

Sponsors

Title sponsor

The current official title sponsor of the Chinese Super League is Ping'an Insurance, under the second sponsor deal between CSL and Ping'an from 2018 through 2022.

Partners and suppliers
As well as sponsorship for the league itself, the Chinese Super League has a number of official partners and suppliers. The official equipment supplier for the league is Nike who have had the contract since the 2005 season. According to data published by Imedia Culture Communication Co., Ltd, the sponsor value from official partners and suppliers of Chinese Super League reaches 600 million Yuan in 2017 season.

The following table shows the partners and suppliers of the Chinese Super League. Bold denotes current sponsor.

Media coverage

China
The first broadcast rights holders of the rebranded Chinese Super League was the Shanghai Media Group (SMG), in September 2003 they signed the contract for 2004 to 2006 season. The second SMG contract was signed in February 2007 for the five-year period from 2007 to 2011.

CCTV acquired the CSL Television rights in 2012, and they held the rights until 2015 under annual contract, CSL was broadcast in CCTV's public cable TV channel CCTV5 and CCTV5+. however, the Sateliite TV rights was sold to Cloud Media from 2014 to 2017.

Starting from the 2016 Season The Chinese Super League sold its television rights on a collective basis. However, it benefits CSL clubs almost equally according to CSL commercial contracts. The money is divided into three parts: 10% reserved for the Chinese football association and CSL company, which is paid out as facilities fees and management expenses, as to the remaining 90%, 81% of them is divided equally between the clubs; and 9% is awarded on a merit basis based on final league position.

The current media rights holder is the China Sports Media Co., Ltd. (CSM, simplified Chinese: 体奥动力，pinyin: tǐ ào dòng lì ), CSM bought the rights for five seasons (2016–2020) for 8 billion yuan in October 2015. On January 24, 2018, The CSL and CSM reached an agreement to extend the original five-year contract to a 10-year one(2016–2025) and to raise the price to 11 billion yuan, about 1.73 billion dollars according to the exchange rate then prevailing.

Worldwide

Outside of China, currently IMG holds the global media rights to the Chinese Super League. The first contract was signed in 2016 for two seasons, and in 2018 IMG and CSM has sealed a three-year extension.  The CSL is now broadcasting in 96 countries across the world.

- other matches also available on Sportdigital

Reserve league and Elite league 
In early years the reserve league was open to all of the reserve teams from the Chinese Super League, China League One, and China League Two clubs. In 2011, the lower leagues started their own reserve league. The CSL reserve league strictly allows CSL clubs to compete, it is played at the next day of the regular league, also in home and away format, since 2018, the reserve league is held in the same venue of the regular league.

From 2014 to 2017, an elite league was held under the reserve league, restricted to players between 17 and 19 years old.

Youth development and Youth super league 
Since the inception of the CSL, the CFA has required all of its clubs to operate youth development, yet it was not a strict criteria until 2018. In the CSL club criteria created in 2017, clubs who could not meet the youth development programme criteria will be relegated to lower leagues.

According to the CSL club criteria, the youth teams of CSL clubs must have their own training center, coaching staff, and medical group, and a minimum of 15% of club budgets must be invested into youth programmes. CSL clubs are required to have 5 youth level teams at ages U19, U17, U15, U14 and U13. Clubs must have youth academies and introduce grassroots football plans to cooperate with local football associations, school and social corporations.

In 2017 the Youth League system was officially rebranded as Youth Super League. YSL is open to all the youth teams of all professional clubs, selected football academies and local FA training teams in China. Since 2018 the U19 Youth Super league is played with two groups of 18, a total of 36 clubs. Clubs plays home and away season with promotion and relegation introduced. The U17 and U15 Youth Super Leagues play in six regional leagues with 76 and 77 teams respectively. The U14 and U13 Youth Super leagues play in five regional leagues with 40 and 45 teams respectively.

Besides the Youth Super League, there are also other tournaments for youth teams across China, including Youth Championship plays in pre-season, Youth FA cup runs during the Youth Super League fixture, and Youth Champions Cup plays in off-season.

See also 

 Football in China
 Chinese Football Association
 Chinese football champions
 Chinese football records
 Chinese FA Cup
 Chinese FA Super Cup
 Chinese Jia-A League
 China League One
 China League Two
 Chinese Champions League
 List of Chinese Super League referees

Notes

References

External links 
 China – List of champions at the RSSSF
 Chinese Super League at theCFA.cn
 Chinese Super League at WildEast Football

 
Summer association football leagues
Top level football leagues in Asia
1
Sports leagues established in 2004
2004 establishments in China
Football
Sports leagues in China
Professional sports leagues in China